Jaki Byard Quartet Live! is an album by pianist Jaki Byard recorded in 1965 and originally released on the Prestige label as two long LP records and later reissued in 1992 as a single CD.

Reception

AllMusic awarded the album 4½ stars with its review by Scott Yanow stating, "The set, recorded live at Lennie's-on-the-Turnpike in Massachusetts, is a superior outing for all of the players... Recommended". Gary Giddins was also positive, and picked out "Twelve" from "the inspired quartet performances": "this piece has free episodes resolved by blues choruses, and Byard's comping is so vigorous that he makes the quartet sound like a larger band".

Track listing 
All compositions by Jaki Byard except as indicated
 "Twelve" – 12:10 Originally released on Vol. 1  
 "Denise" – 9:41 Originally released on Vol. 1   
 "Thing What Is"  (Alan Dawson) – 11:36 Originally released on Vol. 1   
 "Broadway" (Billy Bird, Teddy McRae, Henri Woode) – 13:39 Originally released on Vol. 1   
 "Alan's Got Rhythm" (Byard, Dawson) – 10:28 Originally released on Vol. 2   
 "Cathy" (Joe Farrell) – 8:08 Originally released on Vol. 2  
 "Bass-Ment Blues"  – 11:18 Originally released on Vol. 2

Personnel 
Jaki Byard – piano
Joe Farrell – tenor saxophone, soprano saxophone, flute, drums
George Tucker – bass
Alan Dawson – drums, vibraphone

References

Further reading 
 Monson, Ingrid (1996) Saying Something: Jazz Improvisation and Interaction. The University of Chicago Press. (Contains a detailed description and discussion of the performance of "Bass-Ment Blues" from this album.)

Jaki Byard live albums
1965 live albums
Prestige Records live albums